The Capital Club Building is a historic office building located at 16 W. Martin St. in Raleigh, Wake County, North Carolina.  It was designed by architect Frank B. Simpson and built in 1929 in the Art Deco style.  It is a 12-story, steel-frame skyscraper in the classic base-shaft-capital form.  It was built for the Capital Club, which was one of the oldest and most prominent organizations for men in the South.

It was listed on the National Register of Historic Places in 1985.

References

Office buildings on the National Register of Historic Places in North Carolina
Art Deco architecture in North Carolina
Skyscraper office buildings in Raleigh, North Carolina
National Register of Historic Places in Raleigh, North Carolina
Office buildings completed in 1929